Grewia tiliifolia (syn. Grewia damine) is a species of flowering plant in the family Malvaceae sensu lato.
A tree reaching , it is found in monsoon and intermediate forest gaps and fringes of Sri Lanka, where the plant is known as "daminiya" in Sinhala and "chadachchi" in Tamil. It is also found in Pakistan (Sind, Punjab), India (Punjab, Madhya Pradesh, Peninsula), Nepal and Southeast Asia. Grewia tiliifolia is used in traditional medicine, using bark and roots for fractures, diarrhoea and skin diseases. Its wood is used for tool handles. The fruit is edible.

References

tiliifolia
Flora of the Indian subcontinent
Flora of Indo-China
Vulnerable plants